Sanborn Regional High School is located in Kingston, New Hampshire and serves the towns of Kingston, Newton, and Fremont. SRHS is a part of the Sanborn Regional School District. The school has a current population of approximately 750 students.

Information

Administration:  Brian Stack, Principal; Robert Dawson, Assistant Principal/Curriculum Director; Steven Krzyzanowski, Assistant Principal; Heidi Leavitt, Director of School Counseling;  and Queen Vicki Parady-Guay, Athletic Director
                       
Address:   17 Danville Road, Kingston, NH 03848

Telephone: (603) 642-3341

Notable alumni
Rachel Wiggin Gould, bass player of The Shaggs (1960's and 1970's all-female group from Fremont, NH), Business Diploma in North Maine Community College

Paul Tedford, CEO of Synergy Resources, Multi-time Softball Champion, ERP Expert, Past President of the KISS fan club, multi time podcast guest, Political Science Degree at The University of New Hampshire

See also

Sanborn Seminary
Kingston, New Hampshire

References

External links
Sanborn Regional School District

Schools in Rockingham County, New Hampshire
Public high schools in New Hampshire
Kingston, New Hampshire